Mariano Quihuis Fragoso (born 28 September 1965) is a Mexican politician from the Ecologist Green Party of Mexico. In 2012 he served as Deputy of the LXI Legislature of the Mexican Congress representing Sonora.

References

1965 births
Living people
Politicians from Sonora
Ecologist Green Party of Mexico politicians
21st-century Mexican politicians
Deputies of the LXI Legislature of Mexico
Members of the Chamber of Deputies (Mexico) for Sonora